Axel Bourlon (born 14 March 1991) is a French Paralympic powerlifter. He won the silver medal in the men's 54 kg event at the 2020 Summer Paralympics held in Tokyo, Japan. He was born with achondroplasia, a form of dwarfism.

Career 

At the 2019 World Para Powerlifting Championships held in Nur-Sultan, Kazakhstan, he competed in the men's 54 kg event. He also competed in this event at the 2021 World Para Powerlifting Championships held in Tbilisi, Georgia.

In September 2021, he was awarded the Ordre national du Mérite.

Results

References

External links 
 
 

Living people
1991 births
Place of birth missing (living people)
Powerlifters at the 2020 Summer Paralympics
Medalists at the 2020 Summer Paralympics
Paralympic medalists in powerlifting
Paralympic silver medalists for France
French male weightlifters
Paralympic powerlifters of France
Sportspeople with dwarfism
Recipients of the Ordre national du Mérite
21st-century French people